The Frost Place is a museum and nonprofit educational center for poetry located at Robert Frost's former home on Ridge Road in Franconia, New Hampshire, United States. The property was listed on the National Register of Historic Places in 1976.

History
According to local family lore, poet Robert Frost spotted this property on the west side of Franconia's Ridge Road in 1915 while looking for a home in the area. He purchased it from farmer Willis Herbert, for whom he supposedly procured an adjacent property. The house is 1½ stories in height, with a long front facade covered by a porch. The facade affords fine views of the Franconia Range and Mount Lafayette.

Frost and his family lived in the house until 1920, and spent their summers there for nearly twenty years. The Frost Place was founded in 1976 when the farm was purchased by the town of Franconia, restored, and given its name, opening as a museum in 1977. Since 1977, the Frost Place has awarded a resident poet award to an emerging American poet, which includes a stipend and the opportunity to live and write in the house during the summer.

Beginning in 2013, The Frost Place began offering an annual chapbook prize, with the winning chapbook published by Bull City Press. Past winners include Jill Osier, Lisa Gluskin Stonestreet, Anders Carlson-Wee, Tiana Clark, Yuki Tanaka, and Cassandra Bruner.

Conferences
The Frost Place sponsors a Conference on Poetry, a Poetry Seminar, and a Conference on Poetry and Teaching.. The Conference on Poetry is directed by poet Gabrielle Calvocoressi, with poet Ross White serving as Associate Director. The Poetry Seminar is directed by poet Patrick Donnelly. The Conference on Poetry and Teaching and the Writing Intensive is directed by poet Dawn Potter; associate director is poet and teacher Kerrin McCadden.

Management
A board of trustees assumed responsibility for the management of the museum and associated programs, and Donald Sheehan served as executive director until 2005. In 2006, the trustees appointed Jim Schley to be Sheehan's successor. From the fall of 2008 until April 2011 the trustees managed The Frost Place. In April 2011, Maudelle Driskell was named executive director. In 2018, poet Jacob Rivers was named assistant to the director.

Resident poets

See also
Robert Frost Farm (Derry, New Hampshire)
Robert Frost Farm (Ripton, Vermont)
Robert Frost Farm (South Shaftsbury, Vermont)
Robert Frost House, Cambridge, Massachusetts
National Register of Historic Places listings in Grafton County, New Hampshire

References

External links
 The Frost Place website
 Poem: On the Porch at the Frost Place by William Matthews, The Atlantic Online, February 1982

Museums established in 1976
Poetry museums
Literary museums in the United States
Museums in Grafton County, New Hampshire
Historic house museums in New Hampshire
Biographical museums in New Hampshire
Houses in Grafton County, New Hampshire
Houses on the National Register of Historic Places in New Hampshire
American poetry
Writers' conferences
Robert Frost
National Register of Historic Places in Grafton County, New Hampshire
Franconia, New Hampshire